is a Japanese film director, scriptwriter, video artist, and actor. Born in Japan and partly raised in the United States, Ogata has worked in the Netherlands, Germany, Japan, and the US. He is a graduate of Harvard College and the Center for Advanced Visual Studies (CAVS) of the Massachusetts Institute of Technology. Ogata has received funding from ZDF German national public television and the Dutch National Film Fund for his screenplays.

His father, was banker Shijuro Ogata and his mother was United Nations High Commissioner for Refugees Sadako Ogata.

Ogata's short film , which he wrote, directed, and produced, was the only Japanese film to be selected for the New Directors/New Films Festival 2007 in New York at the Museum of Modern Art and the Film Society of Lincoln Center. It won the Best Short Film Award at the 2007 Bangkok International Film Festival in Thailand, the Seahorse Award Best Short Film at the Moondance International Film Festival 2007, and the Indie Soul Best Story Line Award at the Boston International Film Festival 2008. , his feature-film directorial debut Cast Me If You Can was released on October 23, 2010 in Japan.

References

External links
 
 Wakiyaku Monogatari official website

Japanese film directors
Japanese screenwriters
Living people
Harvard College alumni
Massachusetts Institute of Technology alumni
Year of birth missing (living people)